The PPR Port Perry Bridge is a truss bridge that carries the Port Perry Branch of the Norfolk Southern Railway across the Monongahela River between the Pennsylvania towns of North Versailles Township, and Duquesne. The bridge was built to serve the Pennsylvania Railroad, to provide better access to industrial sites, and to help through trains bypass downtown Pittsburgh. Today, the bridge and corresponding route serve a similar purpose and are used to allow high-level loads, especially double-stacked container cars, to avoid the narrower routes through Pittsburgh.

See also
List of bridges documented by the Historic American Engineering Record in Pennsylvania
Port Perry, Pennsylvania

External links

 

Railroad bridges in Pennsylvania
Bridges over the Monongahela River
Bridges completed in 1903
Historic American Engineering Record in Pennsylvania
Norfolk Southern Railway bridges
Pennsylvania Railroad bridges
Bridges in Allegheny County, Pennsylvania